Nawaz Khan (born 29 October 1995) is an Afghan cricketer. He made his List A debut for Afghanistan A against Zimbabwe A during their tour to Zimbabwe on 31 January 2017. He made his first-class debut for Mis Ainak Region in the 2017–18 Ahmad Shah Abdali 4-day Tournament on 20 October 2017. He made his Twenty20 debut for Speen Ghar Tigers in the 2019 Shpageeza Cricket League on 11 October 2019.

References

External links
 

1995 births
Living people
Afghan cricketers
Boost Defenders cricketers
Mis Ainak Knights cricketers
Place of birth missing (living people)